The Ballad of Genesis and Lady Jaye is a documentary film, directed by Marie Losier and released in 2011. The film is a portrait of influential transgender musician and performance artist Genesis P-Orridge and their partner Lady Jaye Breyer P-Orridge, focusing in particular on the Pandrogyny project of plastic surgery and body modification that they both undertook to become more similar to each other in appearance.

The film had its theatrical premiere in February 2011 at the 61st Berlin International Film Festival, where it won the Teddy Award for best LGBTQ-related documentary film.

References

External links
 

2011 films
2011 documentary films
American documentary films
American LGBT-related films
British documentary films
British LGBT-related films
2011 LGBT-related films
Transgender-related documentary films
Documentary films about electronic music and musicians
2010s English-language films
2010s American films
2010s British films